S. P. Oswal is an Indian industrialist and the present head of the Vardhman Group The Government of India honoured him in 2010, with the Padma Bhushan, the third highest civilian award, for his services to the fields of trade and industry.

Life sketch

S. P. Oswal was born in 1942, in Punjab. He is a post graduate in Commerce from Punjab University which he passed with Gold Medal. in the eighties, Oswal joined his family business group, Vardhman Group of Companies. He presently heads the group. S.P. oswal is Jain by religion.

S. P. Oswal is reported to have contributed to strengthen the spinning industry in North India. He is also regarded as the force behind the establishment of Ludhiana Stock Exchange in 1983. Apart from leading the Vardhman Group into a position of prominence in the Indian business milieu, Oswal was also involved in many socially relevant initiatives.

Oswal is married to Shakun and the couple has a daughter, Suchita, whose husband, Sachit Jain, is an Executive Director of the Vardhman Group.

Village Adoption Program
The state of Punjab witnessed a sudden drop in the yield of cotton, in 2001, due to devastation of crops and shrinking of cotton fields. S. P. Oswal, as a measure to bring back the cotton yield to desirable levels, started an initiative of Village adoption whereby by the villagers are provided with advanced cultivation techniques and support such as soil testing and water and fertiliser management. The initiative was reported to be successful in improving cotton yield. Dr. A. P. J. Abdul Kalam, then President of India, mentioned about the initiative twice in his addresses, the first on Technology Day address of 11 May 2004 and, again, on the following Republic Day of India on 26 January 2005. He also made a visit to Gehri Butter, one of the participating villages, on 10 December 2005.

Sri Aurobindo College of Commerce and Management
Inspired by the teachings of Aurobindo, S. P. Oswal established a trust, in Ludhiana, by name, Sri Aurobindo Socio Economic and Management Research Institute. Sri Aurobindo College of Commerce and Management was opened in 2004, under the trust, to create career oriented and disciplined management professionals. The college is affiliated to the Punjab University.(PBP) S. P. Oswal has also contributed to the setting up of a public school, Sri Aurobindo Public School, in Baddi, Himachal Pradesh, which started functioning in 1996.

Nimbua Greenfield (Punjab) Limited

During the start of the century, S. P. Oswal rallied a few like-minded companies for tackling the issue of hazardous waste disposal. Nine companies, including Vardhman Group, came forward and with the assistance from Punjab Pollution Control Board and the Government of India, a public limited company, Nimbua Greenfield (Punjab) Limited, was floated on 1 March 2004. The primary focus of the company was to develop common facilities for the storage, treatment and disposal of hazardous waste.

The newly formed company set up a facility at Nimbua village, in Mohali on 23 October 2007. The company claims that it treated and disposed 113763 tonnes of hazardous industrial waste since inception till 31 July 2013. This waste management, spread on a land f 20 acres, facility has an estimated life till 2030.

Positions
Business Positions
 Chairman and managing director – Vardhman Textiles Ltd
 Chairman – Vardhman Holdings Ltd
 Chairman – Vardhman Acrylics Ltd
 Chairman – Nimbua Greenfield (Punjab) Ltd

Social Positions
 Chairman – National Committee on Textiles, Confederation of Indian Industry
 Director – Exim Bank of India
 Director – UTI Trustee Company Pvt Ltd (He resigned from the post in 2013)
 Chairman – Indian Institute of Technology, Delhi
 Chairman – Managing Committee- Sri Aurobindo College of Commerce and Management
 Member – National Council, Confederation of Indian Industry
 Member – Industrial Advisory Council, Government of Madhya Pradesh
 Member – Board of Governors – Punjab Technical University, Jalandhar
 Member – Senate, Punjab University
 Founder President and Director (1983–87)- Ludhiana Stock Exchange

Awards and recognitions
 Padma Bhushan – 2010
 Udyog Ratna – Punjab University

See also
 Vardhman Group of Companies

External links
 Interview with S. P. Oswal
 Sri Aurobindo College of Commerce and Management
 Padma Bhushan award ceremony
 Business performance – Vardhman Group
 Interview on Market Times TV – YouTube video
 News on business expansion in Business Standard

References

1942 births
Living people
Recipients of the Padma Bhushan in trade and industry
Businesspeople from Punjab, India
Indian chairpersons of corporations